Craig Silvey (born 1 January 1982) is an Australian novelist. Silvey has twice been named one of the Best Young Australian Novelists by The Sydney Morning Herald and has been shortlisted for the International Dublin Literary Award. His 2009 second novel was selected by the American Library Association as "Best Fiction for Young Adults" in their 2012 list, and was made into the movie Jasper Jones in 2017.

Life and career
Silvey grew up in a town in the south-west of Western Australia called Dwellingup. His father was an industrial arts teacher, and his mother was a teacher-librarian.

His elementary education was at the independent Pioneer Village School. Silvey describes the school as unusual in that it is located in Armadale's Pioneer Village which is an open-air museum "...in the style of an 1800s gold mining town with an old mine shaft".

"It was certainly weird", says Silvey. "The girls had straw hats and big white socks, the boys had black cricket-style caps. Other than that it was standard private-school fare. The classes were small and the teachers great."

Silvey's secondary education was at the independent Frederick Irwin Anglican School in Mandurah.

Rather than going to university, Silvey took on menial labouring and cleaning jobs to support his writing.

He published his first novel, Rhubarb, in 2004, after writing it when he was only 19 years old. This novel would place Silvey on The Sydney Morning Herald's Best Young Australian Novelists list in 2005.

Silvey's second novel Jasper Jones was completed in early 2008 with the aid of an Australia Council's New Work Grant. The novel was described as conforming "to the conventions of Australian Gothic, which projects contemporary experience onto … dysfunctional families in small, remote towns.... where young protagonists encounter violence or death, and where outsiders are punished for their difference". Jasper Jones is Silvey's most successful novel, selling well (half a million copies), and having won or been short listed for several prominent literary awards. A film adaptation of the novel, based on a screenplay written by Silvey and Shaun Grant, was released in 2017. The film was directed by Rachel Perkins and stars Toni Collette, Levi Miller, Aaron McGrath, and Angourie Rice.

In 2010, Silvey was once again named one of The Sydney Morning Herald's Best Young Australian Novelists of the year.
 
Silvey says of his literary influences that "I've always been attracted to Southern Gothic fiction. There's something very warm and generous about those regional American writers like Twain and Lee and Capote, and it seemed to be a literary ilk that would lend itself well to the Australian condition." Australian authors Silvey admires include Shaun Tan, Markus Zusak, Christos Tsiolkas, Tim Winton and Gail Jones who he says "write such distinct, brave and beautiful books that simply render me awestruck".

He currently lives in Fremantle. Silvey is a musician and plays the electric ukulele in The Nancy Sikes band.

Works
2004: Rhubarb (novel)
2007: The World According to Warren (children's book) 
2009: Jasper Jones (novel)
2012: The Amber Amulet (novella)
2017: Jasper Jones (screenplay co-written with Shaun Grant)
Date TBA: The Prospector (screenplay)
September 2020: Honeybee (novel)
2022: Runt (novel)

Awards
Rhubarb was selected as the inaugural book for the "One Book" series of events at the 2005 Perth International Arts Festival, and was included in the Australian national "Books Alive" campaign.

Jasper Jones was shortlisted for the 2011 International Dublin Literary Award. The novel was shortlisted for the Michael L. Printz Award in 2012 by the American Library Association.

Honeybee won the Fiction prize at the 2021 Indie Book Awards and was shortlisted for the 2021 Literary fiction book of the year at the Australian Book Industry Awards. Runt was shortlisted for the Children's prize at the 2023 Indie Book Awards.

References

External links

Allen & Unwin author page including an extract from Jasper Jones, author interview and publication information.
Review of Jasper Jones and interview with Craig Silvey.
Review of Rhubarb, Booklover Book Reviews
More than Rhubarb, a profile of Silvey that originally appeared in The Big Issue in 2009.

1982 births
21st-century Australian novelists
Australian male novelists
Living people
Writers from Western Australia
People from Dwellingup, Western Australia
21st-century Australian male writers